Gloria Ester “Loli” Villamayor Jara (born 10 April 1992) is a Paraguayan footballer who plays as a forward for Liga MX Femenil club Deportivo Toluca and the Paraguay women's national team. She previously played for Colo-Colo in the Chilean women's football championship.

With Everton she was the top-scorer of the 2010 Copa Libertadores Femenina.

References

External links
 Profile at La Liga
 Gloria Villamayor at BDFutbol

1992 births
Living people
Sportspeople from Asunción
Paraguayan women's footballers
Women's association football forwards
Everton de Viña del Mar footballers
Colo-Colo (women) footballers
Zaragoza CFF players
Patriotas Boyacá footballers
Real Oviedo (women) players
CDE Racing Féminas players
Primera División (women) players
Segunda Federación (women) players
Paraguay women's international footballers
Footballers at the 2019 Pan American Games
Pan American Games competitors for Paraguay
Paraguayan expatriate women's footballers
Paraguayan expatriate sportspeople in Chile
Expatriate women's footballers in Chile
Paraguayan expatriate sportspeople in Spain
Expatriate women's footballers in Spain
Paraguayan expatriate sportspeople in Colombia
Expatriate women's footballers in Colombia
Paraguayan expatriate sportspeople in Mexico
Expatriate women's footballers in Mexico
Paraguayan women's futsal players